La fuga dei diamanti is a 1914 Italian film directed by Augusto Genina. It was followed in 1915 by the sequel La conquista dei diamanti.

References

Sources
 Roberto Poppi, 2002: I Registi, p. 200. Editore Gremese: Roma  (online version)

1914 films
Italian silent films
Films directed by Augusto Genina
Italian black-and-white films